Tanacetum balsamita is a perennial temperate herb known as costmary, alecost, balsam herb, bible leaf, or mint geranium.

Description
During summer, it shows small, yellow, button-shaped blossoms which appear in clusters.

Name
The English name 'costmary' stems from 'costus of Saint Mary'. Also, in other languages, it is associated with the Virgin Mary, most probably because it is sometimes used to treat women's diseases.

Origin and spread
The plant seems to have originated in the Mediterranean. Whether the plant called "balsamita" described by Columella in 70 AD  is the same is unclear. According to Heinrich Marzell, it was first mentioned in 812 in a plant catalogue. Costmary was widely grown since the medieval times in herb gardens until the late 19th and early 20th centuries for medical purposes. Nowadays, it has mostly disappeared in Europe, but is still widely used in southwest Asia. 
It was used in medieval times as a place marker in Bibles. It is referred to by Nicholas Culpeper as the 'balsam herb'.

Chemical constituents
Leaves of the plant have been found to contain a range of essential oils. A Spanish study found the oil includes carvone as the main component (51.5%, 41.0%, and 56.9% in three samples), together with minor amounts of β-thujone, t-dihydrocarvone, c-dihydrocarvone, dihydrocarveol isomer, c-carveol, and t-carveol. Levels of β-thujone, a toxic ketone, were 9.8%, 12.5%, and 12.1% in the respective samples.

Traditional medicine

In medieval times, costmary was used for menstruation problems. In the 18th century, it was classified as laxative, against stomach problems, and as an astringent. It was recommended against melancholy and hysteria, as well as dysentery and against gallbladder disease.

The plant is known from ancient herbals and was widely grown in Elizabethan knot gardens. 

The 17th-century herbalist Nicholas Culpeper says of costmary:
"It is under the dominion of Jupiter. The ordinary costmary, as well as maudlin, provokes urine abundantly, and softens the hardness of the mother; it gently purgeth choler and phlegm, extenuating that which is gross, and cutting that which is tough and glutinous, cleanseth that which is foul, and prevents putrefaction; it openeth obstructions and relieves their bad effects, and it is beneficial in all sorts of dry agues. It is astringent to the stomach, and strengtheneth the livers other viscera: and taken in whey, worketh more effectively. Taken fasting in the morning, it relieves chronic pains in the head, and to stay, dry up, and consume all their rheums or distillations from the head into the stomach, a much to digest raw humours gathered therein,   It is  profitable for those [who] are fallen into a continual evil disposition of the body, called cachexy, especially in beginning of the disease.  It is good for weak and cold livers. The seed is given to children for worms, and so is the infusion of flowers in white wine, about two ounces at a time. It maketh an excellent salve to heal old ulcers, being boiled with oil of olive, and adder's tongue with it; and after is strained, put in a little wax, rosin, and turpentine to make it as thick as required."

References

Further reading
 Culpepers British Herbal - Pub. William Nicholson and Son - C. 1905 (re-print of the 1653 original)

balsamita
Plants described in 1753
Taxa named by Carl Linnaeus